To Catch a Spy is a 1971 comedy film starring Kirk Douglas

To Catch a Spy may also refer to:
 To Catch a Spy (1957 film) the English title for Action immédiate
To Catch a Spy, novel by Stuart M. Kaminsky 2002
To Catch a Spy (The Secret Service), episode in children's TV series 
To Catch a Spy, a 2021 Hallmark Movies & Mysteries television movie starring Colin Donnell.